Ronja Mannov Olesen (born 5 July 1987 in Copenhagen) is a Danish actress who mainly acted in En mand kommer hjem, a Danish movie directed by Thomas Vinterberg (2007).

Filmography
Stykke for stykke (short) as Påklæder
2007 En mand kommer hjem (Un homme rentre chez lui, When a Man comes Home) as Maria
2000 Snedronningen (short) as Gerda
1997 Bryggeren (TV mini-series) as Store Theodora / Theodora
 12. afsnit, 1884-1887 (1997) … Theodora
 11. afsnit, 1877-1883 (1997) … Store Theodora (as Ronja Olesen)

References

1987 births
Danish child actresses
Danish film actresses
Living people